Brymbo Hall, one of Britain's lost houses, was a manor house located near Brymbo outside the town of Wrexham, North Wales. The house, reputed to have been partly built to the designs of Inigo Jones, was noted as the residence of 18th-century industrialist and ironmaster John "Iron-Mad" Wilkinson.

Early history

Its early history was relatively obscure, the deeds having been destroyed in a fire in 1794, though it was thought a house on the site had been constructed in the late 15th century for Edward ap Morgan ap Madoc, gentleman. Edward's son, Gruffydd, founded the locally-prominent Griffith family in the early 16th century, and a more modern house was built in 1624 for Edward's descendant John Griffith.

A persistent local tradition claimed that not only had Inigo Jones designed the 1624 building, but that he had been born at the old Brymbo Hall (little is recorded of Jones's early life but he is generally thought to have been born in London, though he was of Welsh descent). However, a portico at the house dated 1624 was more firmly attributed to the architect, though it was later noted that the aedicular doorway was in fact a copy of Plate 158 in Sebastiano Serlio's Fourth Book, the Regole generali d'architettura (1537). Jones was also considered to have designed the chapel set in the grounds of the house. The main 1624 building was later extended by an eastern wing featuring a giant order of Doric pilasters.

In 1649 Brymbo Hall was acquired by Sir Richard Saltonstall, an early settler in New England, on his return to Britain. By the close of the 17th century it was again occupied by the Griffith family, being owned by Robert Griffith, who served as High Sheriff of Denbighshire in 1684-5. Robert's only son John matriculated from Christ Church, Oxford in 1695, aged 18; but appears to have died, without issue, before his parents, as the property was inherited by Robert's daughter Mary. As a highly marriageable heiress, Mary married Robert Jeffreys of Acton Hall and after his death married again, to Richard Clayton of Lea Hall in Shropshire. She then married a third time, to Arthur Owen, a member of the Owen family of Brogyntyn, Shropshire. Her daughter Jane Clayton married Watkin Wynne of Voelas; their daughter, Elizabeth Wynne, married Thomas Assheton Smith I. During the mid-18th century the estate was the subject of several lawsuits between relatives of Arthur Owen and Richard Clayton.

Purchase by John Wilkinson

John Wilkinson bought the  Brymbo Hall estate in 1792 for the sum of £14,000. The land was rich in coal and ironstone deposits, and Wilkinson constructed an ironworks (later to become the Brymbo Steelworks) near the Hall. His son occasionally lived at the property after his death, and the estate was later to be managed by William Legh, the father of William Legh, 1st Baron Newton. However, the estate was sold off to pay the costs of a complex and long-running lawsuit between Wilkinson's heirs; by 1841 it had been purchased by the barrister Robert Roy, one of the original trustees appointed on Wilkinson's death. Roy, along with Henry Robertson and others, formed the Brymbo Mineral & Railway Company and restarted iron production on the estate. The house itself was later to be occupied by the Darby family, the descendants of Abraham Darby III, who were appointed as the ironworks managers.

During the late 19th century Brymbo Hall was the country home of the Liberal MP for Denbighshire, George Osborne Morgan: another Liberal MP, Christmas Price Williams, grew up there.

The Hall was largely unoccupied after 1930 and gradually fell into disrepair. It became partly derelict after World War II, when it was used by the military, and its lower floors were used for keeping livestock by a local farmer. It was eventually demolished in 1973 when open cast mining was carried out on the site, and is still considered to be one of the most unfortunate architectural losses in Wales.

Local traditions
In addition to the Inigo Jones tradition, a local story said the house, and the road leading to it, was haunted by a "grey lady" supposed to be the ghost of Jane Wynn, who lived there alone in the 18th century, following the death of her husband. Another tale concerned a room in which shutters would refuse to stay closed, following the death of the (apocryphal) daughter of a 19th-century owner.

A stand of twelve trees in the grounds was known as the "Twelve Apostles" or  "Twelve Disciples"; the trees were also eventually uprooted by the National Coal Board.

References

Other sources
Lloyd, T. Lost Houses of Wales, Save Britain's Heritage, 1986

Houses in Wrexham
Former buildings and structures in Wrexham County Borough
Welsh country houses destroyed in the 20th century
Former country houses in Wales
Baroque architecture in the United Kingdom